Limenitis trivena, the Indian white admiral, is a species of nymphalid butterfly found in tropical and subtropical Asia.

See also
White admiral (disambiguation)

Cited references

References
 
 
 

Limenitis
Butterflies of Asia
Butterflies described in 1864
Taxa named by Frederic Moore